Sabre Aircraft was an American aircraft manufacturer, specializing in ultralight trikes and their hang glider-style wings. It was located in Buckeye, Arizona.

In circa 2000 the company was noted for producing the least expensive single and two-seat completed, ready-to-fly aircraft available. By 2000 they had sold more than 200 aircraft. The company claimed that it was the "largest and oldest Trike manufacturer in the United States".

The company wound up operations in 2008, stating on their website "Sabre is no longer in the business of building ultralight trikes. We felt that it was time to move on."

Aircraft

Gallery

References

External links

 Sabre Aircraft website archives on Archive.org

Defunct aircraft manufacturers of the United States
Ultralight trikes